Cameron Spencer (born April 6, 2000) is an American college basketball player for the Rutgers Scarlet Knights of the Big Ten Conference. He previously played for the Loyola Greyhounds.

Early life and high school career
Spencer grew up in Davidsonville, Maryland and attended the Boys' Latin School of Maryland in Baltimore. He was named the Maryland Interscholastic Athletic Association (MIAA) Player of the Year as a senior after he averaged 25 points, seven rebounds, and 4.5 assists per game.

College career
Spencer began his college basketball career with the Loyola Greyhounds. He averaged ten points, 3.1 assists, and 3.4 rebounds in 23 games before suffering a hip injury and was named to the Patriot League All-Freshman team. Spencer missed most of his sophomore season while recovering from his hip injury. He returned for the final five games of the season and averaged 10.2 points. Spencer was named first team All-Patriot League as a junior after averaging 18.9 points, 4.8 rebounds, 3.2 assists, and 2.3 steals per game. Following the end of the season, Spencer entered the NCAA transfer portal.

Spencer ultimately transferred to Rutgers after also receiving interest from Minnesota and NC State. He entered the 2022–23 as a starting guard for the Scarlet Knights. Spencer scored 14 points on 6-of-8 shooting, including a go-ahead three-point shot with 13.3 seconds left, in Rutgers' 65–64 upset win over top-ranked Purdue. Spencer was named the Big Ten Conference Player of the Week after scored another go-ahead three pointer with 15 seconds left and scored 23 points overall in a 65-62 win against Northwestern on January 11, 2023  and scored 21 points with six rebounds, six assists, and four steals as Rutgers beat Ohio State 68–64.

Career statistics

College

|-
| style="text-align:left;"| 2019–20
| style="text-align:left;"| Loyola
| 23 || 9 || 28.0 || .491 || .436 || .857 || 3.4 || 3.1 || .3 || .0 || 10.0
|-
| style="text-align:left;"| 2020–21
| style="text-align:left;"| Loyola
| 5 || 3 || 25.6 || .425 || .467 || .769 || 4.4 || 3.0 || 1.0 || .2 || 10.2
|-
| style="text-align:left;"| 2021–22
| style="text-align:left;"| Loyola
| 30 || 30 || 36.9 || .468 || .353 || .858 || 4.8 || 3.2 || 2.3 || .2 || 18.9
|- class="sortbottom"
| style="text-align:center;" colspan="2"| Career
| 58 || 42 || 32.4 || .471 || .388 || .851 || 4.2 || 3.1 || 1.4 || .2 || 14.6

Personal life
Spencer's older brother, Pat, was a four-time All-American and won the Tewaaraton Award as a lacrosse player at Loyola before playing a season of college basketball at Northwestern. He now plays basketball professionally for the Santa Cruz Warriors of the NBA G League.

References

External links
Rutgers Scarlet Knights bio
Loyola Greyhounds bio

2000 births
Living people
American men's basketball players
Basketball players from Maryland
Rutgers Scarlet Knights men's basketball players
Shooting guards
Loyola Greyhounds men's basketball players